Michael Henry Pullen (7 January 1921 – 26 October 1969) was an Australian rules footballer who played with North Melbourne in the Victorian Football League (VFL).

Family
The son of Frank Brougham Pullen (1887–1958), and Margaret Jane Hilda Pullen (1890–1947), née Molloy, Michael Henry Pullen was born at North Melbourne, Victoria on 7 January 1921. 

He married Dorothy Woods (1922–2015) on 24 July 1943.

Football

North Melbourne (VFL)
Recruited from West Melbourne in the Sub-District League.

RAAF
In 1943, he was playing for a RAAF team in Sydney.

Military service 
Pullen served in both the Australian Army, and the Royal Australian Air Force, during World War II.

KH210
He was seriously injured when the Liberator bomber (KH210) in which he was the co-pilot was ditched in the Bay of Bengal, in flames, while returning to its base at Salboni, during a bombing raid on Rangoon in May 1945.

The plane's observer, Wing Commander J.B. Nicholson  died. Pullen and one of his crew, nose gunner Flight Sergeant Eric Leslie Kightley (RAF 1480397)  neither of whom had any memory of the moment that the plane hit the water  were rescued by separate Air/Sea Rescue US Catalinas after clinging to the wreckage for 14 hours in the water. Both were hospitalized in Calcutta and treated for their injuries and attendant shock.

Notes

References
 
  
 World War II Service Record (Army): Private Michael Henry Pullen (VX82067), National Archives of Australia.
 
 World War II Service Record (RAAF): Warrant Officer Michael Henry Pullen (434840), National Archives of Australia.

External links 

1921 births
1969 deaths
Australian rules footballers from Melbourne
North Melbourne Football Club players
Australian Army personnel of World War II
Australian Army soldiers
Royal Australian Air Force personnel of World War II
Royal Australian Air Force airmen
Australian World War II pilots
Military personnel from Melbourne
People from North Melbourne